John "Jack" Wells (4 January 1883 – 17 December 1966) was an Australian rules footballer who played for  and  in the Western Australian Football Association (WAFA), Kalgoorlie City in the Goldfields Football Association (GFA), St Kilda and Carlton in the Victorian Football League (VFL), and  in the Victorian Football Association (VFA).

Career
Born in Stawell, Victoria, to William Wells and Jane Mary Reid, Wells played his early football in Western Australia where he spent time in both Kalgoolie and Perth.

Originally playing for Rovers, he switched to Perth after the club folded midway through the 1898 season. He represented the Perth Football Club in their inaugural WAFA season and topped their goal kicking in 1904. His tally that year included what was then a club record 11 goals in a match against Subiaco. Before crossing to the VFL he played in the Goldfields Football Association with Kalgoorlie City and was the league's 'Best and fairest' winner in 1905.

He was used in a variety of position during his career, mostly as a centreman, up forward and in the ruck. In his four seasons at St Kilda he struggled with injuries but captained the club in 1907, to their first ever finals appearance, and at the beginning of 1908. He joined Carlton in 1910 and played in their losing Grand Final side that year. In 1912 he was appointed captain and the following season captained-coached Carlton to sixth place. A four-time Victorian interstate representative, Wells was picked to captain his state in a match against South Australia in 1912 but had withdraw due to an injury.
  
After leaving Carlton, Wells finished his career in the VFA at North Melbourne.

External links

1883 births
Australian rules footballers from Victoria (Australia)
Australian rules footballers from Western Australia
Australian Rules footballers: place kick exponents
Carlton Football Club players
Carlton Football Club coaches
Kalgoorlie City Football Club players
North Melbourne Football Club (VFA) players
Perth Football Club players
Rovers Football Club players
St Kilda Football Club players
1966 deaths
People from Stawell, Victoria